Gurbulaq (also, Gürbulaq) is a village and municipality in the Dashkasan Rayon of Azerbaijan.  It has a population of 360.

References 

Populated places in Dashkasan District